The De Smet Range is a mountain range of the Canadian Rockies located northwest of Highway 16 and Jasper Lake in Jasper National Park, Canada. The range is named after its highest point Roche de Smet, which in turn was named by Iroquois working in the fur trade industry. The Iroquois named the peak after Pierre-Jean De Smet, a Belgian missionary who had worked with the indigenous native peoples in the 1840s in Western Canada and Northwestern United States.

This range includes the following mountains and peaks:

References 

Mountain ranges of Alberta
Ranges of the Canadian Rockies